The Winchcombe Chronicle is a chronicle of the town of Winchcombe from about 1140-1145.

The original text was drafted in the 1140s, and later extended to 1181. The chronicle is also sometimes known as the Annals of Winchcombe, though it differs from the earlier Winchcombe Annals, produced by the same Abbey.

The Latin chronicle is anonymous, but was written in the Benedictine, Winchcombe Abbey (Gloucestershire).

The manuscript is in two parts. The first, the work of a single scribe, is a world history from creation to 1122 which takes much of its material from John of Worcester's Chronica chronicarum.

The addendum contains more recent material. The manuscript also has numerous margin notes of more recent events.

The manuscript is currently held at the Bodleian Library, and is found at BL, Cotton Tiberius E iv, folios 1r-27v.

References

History books about England
Works by English writers
English non-fiction literature
Cotton Library
English chronicles
11th century in England
12th century in England
11th-century Latin books
12th-century Latin books
Winchcombe